Dame Nicola Velfor Davies  (born 13 March 1953) is a judge of the Court of Appeal of England and Wales, to which she was appointed in 2018. At the Bar she practised in medical law. She is referred to as Rt Hon Lady Justice Nicola Davies.

Early life
Davies was born in Llanelli, Wales, and grew up in Bridgend. Her father, Eric Davies, was a chartered engineer who was employed by the Steel Company of Wales, and she has a younger brother called Jonathan. She was educated at Bridgend Girls' Grammar School (now closed), where she was the last head girl. In 1971 she entered Birmingham University to read law.

Career
After graduating, Davies worked briefly in a firm of solicitors before becoming an investment analyst in the City of London. She later decided to become a barrister and did her second six-month pupillage at Carpmael Buildings, which later became 3 Serjeant's Inn. She was called to the bar at Gray's Inn in 1976. As a young barrister acting as a junior counsel to the two doctors involved in the Cleveland child abuse cases, she became recognised as a medical specialist. She also became a member of the Treasury Panels.
 
In 1992, at the age of 39, she became a Queen's Counsel, and in 1998 she was appointed to sit as an Assistant Recorder. She chaired two Inquiries. In 1998 Davies spent six months on the Bristol heart surgeon's case, then took on the defence of the doctor and serial killer Harold Shipman.

In 2003, Davies was appointed as a deputy High Court judge. On judicial review she quashed a decision to close some National Health Service paediatric surgery units. She was appointed a High Court judge in 2010.

In 2013 Davies was appointed as a Presiding Judge of the Wales Circuit between 1 January 2014 and 31 December 2017.

Davies is an Honorary Fellow of Cardiff University.

She was sworn as a member of the Privy Council of the United Kingdom in 2018.

In July 2021, Davies made legal history, chairing the first all-female Court of Appeal session in Wales, sitting alongside Mrs Justice Jefford and Mrs Justice Steyn.

References

External links
 The Rt. Hon. Mrs Justice Nicola Davies DBE, Judicial Appointments Commission

1953 births
Living people
Members of Gray's Inn
Queen's Bench Division judges
Dames Commander of the Order of the British Empire
Welsh women judges
Alumni of the University of Birmingham
Welsh King's Counsel
20th-century King's Counsel
21st-century Welsh judges
20th-century Welsh lawyers
Lady Justices of Appeal
Members of the Privy Council of the United Kingdom
20th-century women lawyers
21st-century women judges
20th-century English women
21st-century English women